The Kennedy Range broad-blazed slider (Lerista kennedyensis)  is a species of skink found in Western Australia.

References

Lerista
Reptiles described in 1989
Taxa named by Peter G. Kendrick